Beitun is a city in the north of Xinjiang, China. Administratively, it is a county-level city under the direct administration of the regional government, though it is geographically located in Altay Prefecture.

Overview 
Beitun was established on 28 December 2011, making it the youngest city in China at the time, later replaced by Sansha, which was established in 2012. It was established from portions of Altay City.

Its name comes from the accolade "China's northernmost cultivation land".

Transportation 
As a terminus of the Kuytun–Beitun Railway, Beitun is an important transportation hub between Mongolia, northern Xinjiang, and Kazakhstan. Beitun Station, located a few kilometers southwest of the city center, has direct passenger railway service from Urumqi.

An extension of this railway toward Altay City is under construction; it is expected to open in 2016.

References 

2011 establishments in China
County-level divisions of Xinjiang
Xinjiang Production and Construction Corps
Populated places on the Irtysh River
Populated places in Xinjiang